Titty or Tittie may refer to:

 Titti (bagpipe), an Indian bagpipe
 Tittie Butte, a mountain in Oregon, United States
 Titty Fruit, a medicinal plant
 Titty Hill, West Sussex, England
 Titty Walker, a fictional character in Arthur Ransome's Swallows and Amazons series of children's books
 a slang term for breast, derived from "tit"

See also
 Tit (disambiguation)
 Titti (disambiguation)